Dracaena stuckyi, synonym Sansevieria stuckyi, is a species of succulent plant native to Africa including Mozambique, Tanzania, and southern Kenya. It is a member of a group of related Dracaena including Dracaena angolensis and Dracaena pearsonii, that grow upright, cylindrical foliage and are native to dry biomes.

Description
Dracaena stuckyi can form clustering series of short distichous stems each bearing from one to several erect leaves, along the trailing rhizomes of the plant. Leaves are circular in cross-section but with a shallow channel on the inner side, leathery, fleshy, dark and decorated with pale marbling. Plants grow to a height of approximately 2 metres depending on light and moisture availability. 

Inflorescences occur in spring or autumn, bearing fragrant, yellow-white flowers.

References

stuckyi